Henrik Andreas Zetlitz Lassen (4 March 1818 - 6 January 1890) was a Norwegian politician.

He was elected to the Norwegian Parliament in 1862 and 1865, representing the constituency of Stavanger. He worked as a physician in that city. In 1874 he was deputy representative.

On the local level he was mayor of Stavanger for three terms.

References

1818 births
1890 deaths
Members of the Storting
Politicians from Stavanger
Mayors of places in Rogaland